The Regius Professor of History may refer to:

The Regius Professor of Modern History (disambiguation)
 The Regius Professor of History (Oxford)
 The Regius Professor of History (Cambridge)
 The Regius Professor of Ecclesiastical History
 The Regius Professor of Natural History (Aberdeen)

See also
Regius Professor